WVDV-LP (104.9 FM, "Radio Voz De La Verdad") is a radio station broadcasting a religious format. Licensed to Sebring, Florida, United States, the station is currently owned by Highlands County Community Broadcasting, Inc.

References

External links
 Official website
 

VDV-LP
VDV-LP
VDV-LP
Sebring, Florida
Radio stations established in 2014
2014 establishments in Florida